Otto Krause (July 10, 1856February 14, 1920) was an Argentine engineer and educator.

Early life
Krause was born in the Buenos Aires Province town of Chivilcoy to Leopoldina and Carl August Krause, both German Argentine immigrants arrived in 1851. Tending his farm with implements he brought from Germany, Carl Krause instilled an interest in machinery to his five children, though the family eventually relocated to Buenos Aires in 1870. Otto subsequently finished his secondary school studies at the prestigious Buenos Aires National College, a public college preparatory school.

Engineer and educator 
He enrolled at the University of Buenos Aires School of Exact Sciences in 1874, though he enlisted in the Argentine Navy as an engineer's assistant later that year. He returned to civilian life in 1878 and obtained a degree in civil engineering, earning a post in the Buenos Aires Teachers' School. Krause then began a career in the Argentine railways, working in the planning department of the Buenos Aires Western Railway in 1879 and later contributing to the lines' extension into then-remote Tucumán and Salta Provinces.

Returning to Buenos Aires in 1882, Krause held technical positions at the 11th of September Station, then the site of a large railyard. He continued to teach the discipline, and in 1887 was commissioned to select material in Europe for the new rail line and facilities to serve the recently founded city of La Plata. The experience earned him a post of technical director of the new mail train established by president Miguel Juárez Celman in 1888, and he became a tenured full professor at the University of Buenos Aires in 1891.

Addressing the rapidly growing country's lack of formal technical schools, he established Argentina's first on March 15, 1897, and two years later, President Julio Roca re-chartered the institution as the National Industrial School, entitling it to public funds. Krause divided his time between the management of the school and diverse public posts, including that of President of the Municipal Tax Court and inspector of mines in the far-western San Juan Province. He continued to teach at his alma mater, as well, and in 1906 was named Dean of the School of Exact Sciences at the university. His efforts on behalf of technical schools included the 1909 inaugural of a new, important building for the National Industrial School in Buenos Aires' San Telmo area (just south of downtown), as well as the establishment of affiliates in La Plata, Rosario, Santa Fe and his hometown, Chivilcoy, among others.

Krause helped plan irrigation works for the Río Negro valley in semi-arid Patagonia before retiring in 1911. He returned in advisory capacity to the University of Buenos Aires in 1919, but died the following February at age 63; the National Industrial School was subsequently renamed the Otto Krause Technical School.

References

Notes

Bibliography

External links 
 Todo Argentina - Biografias - Ingeniero Otto Krause (1856-1920) (accessed 2017-01-28)

1856 births
1920 deaths
Argentine people of German descent
People from Buenos Aires Province
University of Buenos Aires alumni
Argentine civil engineers
Academic staff of the University of Buenos Aires
Burials at La Recoleta Cemetery